Karayi Krishnan Gurukkal was born on the (1855-1888) at Otayothu house in Chirakkal taluk, Kannur of North Malabar. He excelled as a writer and Malayalam scholar,  He was known as a man who excelled in extraordinary poetic ability.  Although he excelled in writer, Poetry, and linguistics, he did not live long. Karayi Krishnan Gurukkal was one of the most notable writers in failed Kerala.  He was also a prominent figure in Sanskrit and Malayalam.  He had two brothers, Karai Katti and Karai Bapu, who were big businessmen and rich.

Bibliography
1.Ramayana Mani pravasam
2.adhithya hrudhayam
3.slogangal
4.lakshmanaparinayam ottanthullal.

References

1855 births
1888 deaths
Writers from Kannur